Brad Schell (born August 5, 1984) is a Canadian former professional ice hockey forward. He was selected by the Atlanta Thrashers in the 9th round (167th overall) of the 2002 NHL Entry Draft.

Schell was named the captain of the American Conference team for the 2007 ECHL All-Star Game.  Schell remained in Europe for his third consecutive season after agreeing to a one-year contract with Italian club, Hockey Milano Rossoblu on August 20, 2013.

After spending the 2014–15 season, with the Herning Blue Fox in the Danish Metal Ligaen, where he led the league in assists with 54 and captured a Danish Cup, Schell continued his journeyman European career, in moving Germany in signing a one-year deal with second tier club, Heilbronner Falken of the DEL2 on July 30, 2015.

Awards and honours

Career statistics

References

External links

1984 births
Atlanta Thrashers draft picks
Canadian ice hockey centres
Chicago Wolves players
Dornbirn Bulldogs players
Graz 99ers players
Gwinnett Gladiators players
HC Milano players
Heilbronner Falken players
Herning Blue Fox players
Lillehammer IK players
Living people
San Antonio Rampage players
Spokane Chiefs players
Canadian expatriate ice hockey players in Austria
Canadian expatriate ice hockey players in Denmark
Canadian expatriate ice hockey players in Norway